Stadion SKA SKVO  (Russian: Стадион СКА-СКВО) is a multi-purpose stadium in Rostov-na-Donu, Russia.  It is currently used mostly for football matches and is the home ground for FC SKA Rostov-on-Don.  The stadium is refurbished and holds 2,200 people.

History
The construction of the sports complex was started in the mid-sixties on the initiative of the Commander of the Troops of the North Caucasus Military District, Colonel-General Altunin. The composition of the district sports complex included the main sports arena with stands for 33 000 seats, a football field, athletics core, a water sports complex with three bathrooms, sports grounds. The main sports arena and the whole SKA SKVO sports complex were put into operation in April 1971. Designer of buildings and structures SKA was the organization "Voenproekt".

On January 28, 2016, the International Federation of Football Associations (FIFA) approved a list of 36 training grounds for the 2018 FIFA World Cup , including the "SKA" stadium in this application. In this regard, it is necessary to reconstruct the stadium to bring it in line with the requirements.

characteristics
Title: SKA SKVO
 Year of foundation: 1971
Total area of the stadium: 13.14 hectares
Grass cover: natural lawn

References

Sports venues completed in 1971
Sports venues built in the Soviet Union
Football venues in Russia
Multi-purpose stadiums in Russia
Sports venues in Rostov-on-Don